The Nachusa Grasslands is a  restored tallgrass prairie near Franklin Grove in Lee County and Ogle County, Illinois. It is managed by The Nature Conservancy staff and volunteers.

History

Most of northern Illinois was tallgrass prairie at the time of statehood in 1818. In the ensuing century, the vast majority of this prairie was plowed up for arable farmland.

Bison reintroduction 

Thirty bison were released on the Nachusa Grasslands in October 2014. The bison were added to the approximately 700 species logged at the prairie. In April 2015, free-range bison calves were born, adding to hope that the Nachusa herd could be managed so as to be self-sustaining. , 14 calves have been born at Nachusa.

Visitor center
The preserve's visitor center includes nearby trailheads, a pavilion with interpretive signage, self-composting restrooms, and a potable water supply. In 2021 it won an architecture award from the 
American Society of Landscape Architects.  Attributes included fulfilling its mission without overpowering the surrounding landscape and that "the facility draws visitors into an interpretive rich shelter framing distant views telling the story of the vast prairie beyond"

February 2020 fire
In February 2020 a fire destroyed the site's pole barn along with much of the equipment used to care for the preserve.  The replacement plans include expansion to allow more space for convening volunteers, partners, scientists  and community leaders.

References

Protected areas of Lee County, Illinois
Bison herds
Grasslands of Illinois
Nature Conservancy preserves
1986 establishments in Illinois
Protected areas established in 1986